The Tamote Shinpin Shwegugyi Temple is a Buddhist temple in Kyaukse, Mandalay Region, Myanmar. It was originally built by King Anawrahta of Pagan, and the second storey added by King Narapatisithu, and both were encased inside a huge stupa built by King Uzana of the Pinya dynasty.  It was one of nine pagodas outside the ancient city that denoted the extent of the Bagan Empire. The temple had a pagoda on top was discovered to be hiding another pagoda inside, which in turn encased a two-storey temple.

Location
The temple is located about northwest of Kyaukse on the road leading to the town of Tada-U. It is near Kyaung Pangon and Nyaung Pin Sauk villages.

History

The first one-storey temple was built by King Anawrahta in the 11th century, and his grandson King Narapatisithu made it with double storey cave temple decorated Jataka stories on the upper terrace in the 12th century, and finally the whole was encased in the 14th century by King Uzana, and further protected by nature. Over the years this became hidden underneath a hill, which in 1915 was topped by a new stupa. In 1993 some traces of an ancient brick structure were detected at the foot of the hill, but permission to excavate was only granted in 2008 due to concerns that doing so would damage the encasing stupa.

In 2015, the Ministry of Religious Affairs and Culture designated Tamote Shinpin Shwegugyi Temple  as an ancient heritage site of Myanmar.

Gallery

References 

Buildings and structures in Mandalay Region

Buddhist temples in Myanmar
11th-century Buddhist temples
Buddhist pilgrimage sites in Myanmar